The 1983–84 Minnesota North Stars season was the North Stars' 17th season.

Coached by Bill Mahoney, the team compiled a record of 39–31–10 for 88 points, to finish the regular season 1st in the Norris Division for the second time in three seasons. The North Stars were the only team in their division to have a winning record that season. In the playoffs, they won their Norris Division Semifinal series 3 games to 2 over the Chicago Black Hawks and followed that with a seven game win over the St. Louis Blues in the Norris Division Final. In the Campbell Conference Final, the North Stars ran out of magic as they were swept in four straight games by the eventual Stanley Cup champion Edmonton Oilers.

Offseason

NHL Draft

Regular season
Bob Rouse, Brian Lawton, and Dirk Graham all made their NHL debuts.

Final standings

Schedule and results

Player statistics

Forwards
Note: GP = Games played; G = Goals; A = Assists; Pts = Points; PIM = Penalty minutes

Defencemen
Note: GP = Games played; G = Goals; A = Assists; Pts = Points; PIM = Penalty minutes

Goaltending
Note: GP = Games played; W = Wins; L = Losses; T = Ties; SO = Shutouts; GAA = Goals against average

Playoffs

Awards and honors

References
 North Stars on Hockey Database

Minnesota North Stars seasons
Minnesota North Stars
Minnesota North Stars
Norris Division champion seasons
Minnesota Twins
Minnesota Twins